Soorsagar Assembly constituency is one of constituencies of Rajasthan Legislative Assembly in the Jodhpur (Lok Sabha constituency). .

List of members

References

See also
Member of the Legislative Assembly (India)

Jodhpur district
Assembly constituencies of Rajasthan